The Dyersburg Deers were a Minor League Baseball team that played in Dyersburg, Tennessee, from 1923 to 1925. They were members of the Class D Kentucky–Illinois–Tennessee League (KITTY League) from 1923 to 1924 during which time they were known as the Dyersburg Forked Dears. They played as simply the Dyersburg Deers in the Class D Tri-State League in 1925. Their home games were played at Scot's Field.

Over three seasons of competition, Dyersburg accumulated a regular season record of 170–141 (.547). They won the KITTY League championship in both 1923 and 1924. Their postseason record was 8–2 (.800).

History

The Dyersburg Forked Deers began competition in 1923 as members of the Class D Kentucky–Illinois–Tennessee League. Their scheduled season opener on May 15 was rained out. They won the next day's game against the Fulton Railroaders, 3–2 in 10 innings, at Scot's Field before a home audience of around 1,200 people. On August 24, June Greene pitched a 10–0 no-hitter against Fulton in the second game of a doubleheader. The Forked Dears won the first half of the league's split season, qualifying for the championship playoffs. They then defeated the Mayfield Pantmakers to win the KITTY League championship, four games to two. Their season record was 51–47 (.520).

The Forked Deers repeated as first half champions in 1924. They won a second KITTY League championship by sweeping the Paris Parisians in four games in the best-of-seven championship series. They accumulated a 60–48 (.556) record during the season.

The KITTY League failed to reorganize for the 1925 season, so Dyersburg joined the Class D Tri-State League. They also shortened their name to simply the Dyersburg Deers. On August 17, William Cason no-hit the Blytheville Tigers in a 4–0 home win. The Deers compiled a season record of 59–46 (.562) but failed to win either half of the season.

Dyersburg did not field another team in 1926. Over three years of competition the team accumulated a record of 170–141 (.547).

Season-by-season results

Notable players
Three players also played in at league one game in Major League Baseball during their careers. These players and their seasons with Dyersburg were:

June Greene (1924–1925)
Phil Hensiek (1925)
Jack Knight (1925)

References

External links
Statistics from Baseball-Reference
Statistics from Stats Crew

1923 establishments in Tennessee
1925 disestablishments in Tennessee
Baseball teams established in 1923
Baseball teams disestablished in 1925
Defunct baseball teams in Tennessee
Defunct Tri-State League teams
Kentucky-Illinois-Tennessee League
Professional baseball teams in Tennessee